Darryn Perry is a former Australian rules footballer who played in Tasmania during the 1980s and 1990s. He was inducted into the Tasmanian Football Hall of Fame in 2012.

Perry played for North Hobart in the Tasmanian Football League (TFL).

References

North Hobart Football Club players
Australian rules footballers from Tasmania
Tasmanian Football Hall of Fame inductees
Living people
Year of birth missing (living people)